The euro (plural euros) is the official currency of the European Union.

Euros may also refer to

 Euros (moth)
 UEFA European Championship, football tournament informally known as the Euros
 Euros, one of the Anemoi (the Greek deities representing wind)

People with the given name
 Euros Bowen (1904–1988), Welsh language poet and priest
 Euros Lyn (born 1971), Welsh television director
 Euros Childs (born 1975), Welsh musician and songwriter

See also
 Evros (disambiguation)